V7 is a London-based artificial intelligence (AI) startup founded in 2018 by Alberto Rizzoli and Simon Edwardsson. The company specializes in data labeling software used in the development of machine learning and computer vision technologies.

History 

V7 was founded in 2018 by entrepreneurs Alberto Rizzoli and Simon Edwardsson. Rizzoli has a background in entrepreneurship, having previously co-founded other technology companies, while Edwardsson is an entrepreneur and computer scientist. The duo came together with the goal creating tools to automate manual tasks involved in AI development, such as image annotation. Initially focusing on the development of computer vision technologies, the company has since expanded its product offerings to encompass multiple AI domains.

The company initially focused on developing labeling tools for the healthcare and life sciences industries seeing potential in software that could tag images for AI produced by health an chemical enterprises such as Merck KGaA. It has since differentiated following a $3 million seed round investment in 2020 which expanded its domain in the understanding of video. In 2022, the company expanded its healthcare capabilities as the industry accounted for over a third of revenue, adding support for multi-modal labeling used in generative pre-trained transformers. Later in the year it received $33 million in series-A funding.

Products and services
V7 Darwin: A software platform consisting of tools for labeling data, managing dataset catalogs, training neural networks, and creating data processing workflows used in AI development.

Partnerships and Collaborations
V7 has established partnerships with numerous organizations developing AI-driven solutions. Some notable collaborations include:

NVIDIA: V7 collaborated with NVIDIA in their 2021 GTC Keynote to showcase how AI can be used in the automotive manufacturing industry to automate robotic and human inspection tasks tasks using dozens of training data examples. The companies also collaborated through the NVIDIA Clara Guardian and DeepStream initiatives speed up labeling up to 50x faster than human performance through V7 Darwin.

COVID-19 research: In 2020 the company developed and published an open dataset of COVID-19 chest x-ray cases with pulmonary segmentations to be used in AI research in collaboration with the U.K.’s National Health Service..

iTobos: V7 is part of the iToBoS (Intelligent Total Body Scanner for Early Detection of Melanoma) project aims at developing an AI diagnostic platform for early detection of melanoma. The platform includes a novel total body scanner and a Computer Aided Diagnostics (CAD) tool to integrate various data sources such as medical records, genomics data and in vivo imaging.

Awards and recognition
In 2021, V7 received the CogX Award for Best AI Product in Healthcare. The company was also nominated among the Top 25 Machine Learning Startups To Watch In 2021 by Forbes.

See also 
 Artificial intelligence
 Machine learning
 Computer vision
 Deep learning

References

External links 
 Official website